Han Jeong-woo ( also known as Han Jeong-uh; born 26 December 1998) is a South Korean footballer who plays as midfielder for Gimpo FC in the K League 2.

Career

FC Kairat
On 26 January 2019, FC Kairat announced the signing of Han on a two-year contract. On 6 January 2020, Kairat announced via Instagram that Han had been released by the club.

Suwon FC
On 9 January 2020, Han was announced as a new signing for Suwon FC of the K League 2. Han made 18 appearances for Suwon FC over the season, scoring 1 goal, as they won promotion to the K League 1 by finishing second.

Dundalk
Han made the move to Europe on 25 March 2021, signing for League of Ireland Premier Division club Dundalk. He made his debut a day later, coming off the bench in a 2–1 defeat to Finn Harps at Oriel Park. Han scored his first goal in Ireland on 24 April 2021, scoring the winning goal in a 2–1 win at home to Drogheda United in the Louth Derby. He scored his first goal in European competition on 8 July 2021, scoring a late header in a 4–0 win over Welsh side Newtown in the UEFA Europa Conference League. He made a total of 18 appearances in all competitions during his time with the club, scoring 3 goals.

Career statistics

Club

References

External links

1998 births
Living people
Association football midfielders
South Korean footballers
FC Kairat players
Suwon FC players
Dundalk F.C. players
League of Ireland players
South Korean expatriate footballers
Expatriate footballers in Kazakhstan
Expatriate association footballers in the Republic of Ireland